Algeria has a multi-party system with numerous political parties, in which no one party often has a chance of gaining power alone, and parties must work with each other to form coalition governments. The Algerian Constitution of 1996 bans the formation of any party "founded on a religious, linguistic, racial, sex, corporatist or regional basis" or violating "the fundamental liberties, the fundamental values and components of the national identity, the national unity, the security and integrity of the national territory, the independence of the country and the People’s sovereignty as well as the democratic and republican nature of the State."

In Arabic, French, and English, major Algerian political parties are typically referred to by the three or four initials of their French names.  (The Movement of Society for Peace, which uses an Arabic acronym, is an exception.) In formal contexts, however, their full names are used.

The parties

Parliamentary parties after 2021 election

Parties that boycotted the last elections

Other parties
Algerian National Party (الحزب الوطني الجزائري, El-Hizb El-Watani El-Djazairy)
Ahd 54
Algerian Party for Democracy and Socialism (Parti Algérien pour la Démocratie et le Socialisme)
Algerian Popular Movement (MPA)
Democratic and Social Movement (MDS)
The Cause (Essabil)
National Republican Alliance (ANR)
Natural Law Party (Parti de la Loi Naturelle)
Socialist Workers' Party
National Party for Solidarity and Development (PNSD)
Workers' Party (PT)

Parties not legally recognized
Wafaa
Arab Socialist Ba'ath Party

Illegal parties
 Hizb ut-Tahrir
 FIS: Islamic Salvation Front (Front Islamique du Salut)

See also
 Politics of Algeria
 List of political parties by country

Algeria
 
Political parties
Algeria
Political parties